Holger Karlsson (3 February 1935 – 18 September 2015) was a Swedish ski jumper. He competed at the 1956 Winter Olympics and the 1964 Winter Olympics.

References

External links
 

1935 births
2015 deaths
Swedish male ski jumpers
Olympic ski jumpers of Sweden
Ski jumpers at the 1956 Winter Olympics
Ski jumpers at the 1964 Winter Olympics
Sportspeople from Norrbotten County